Filipe Guterres Nascimento (born 7 January 1995) is a Portuguese professional footballer who plays for Polish club Radomiak Radom as a central midfielder.

Club career
Born in Loures, Lisbon District, Nascimento played youth football for S.L. Benfica. In 2014 he signed with Académico de Viseu FC, making his debut as a professional on 27 July in a 4–1 home win against Portimonense S.C. in the first round of the Taça da Liga in which he started.

Nascimento scored his first goal in the Segunda Liga on 23 November 2014, netting from a penalty kick to help to a 3–0 home victory over C.D. Santa Clara. He subsequently moved to the Romanian Liga I, where he represented CFR Cluj and FC Dinamo București.

On 29 January 2018, Nascimento moved clubs and countries again, signing with Bulgaria's PFC Levski Sofia. He returned to the Romanian top division the following year, on a loan at FC Politehnica Iași.

Nascimento joined Radomiak Radom of the Polish I liga on 23 February 2021.

Career statistics

Club

Honours
Benfica
UEFA Youth League runner-up: 2013–14

CFR Cluj
Cupa României: 2015–16
Supercupa României runner-up: 2016

Levski Sofia
Bulgarian Cup runner-up: 2017–18

Radomiak Radom
I liga: 2020–21

References

External links

Portuguese League profile 

Levski official profile

1995 births
Living people
People from Loures
Footballers from Lisbon
Portuguese footballers
Association football midfielders
Liga Portugal 2 players
S.L. Benfica footballers
Académico de Viseu F.C. players
Liga I players
CFR Cluj players
FC Dinamo București players
FC Politehnica Iași (2010) players
First Professional Football League (Bulgaria) players
PFC Levski Sofia players
Ekstraklasa players
I liga players
Radomiak Radom players
Portugal youth international footballers
Portuguese expatriate footballers
Expatriate footballers in Romania
Expatriate footballers in Bulgaria
Expatriate footballers in Poland
Portuguese expatriate sportspeople in Romania
Portuguese expatriate sportspeople in Bulgaria
Portuguese expatriate sportspeople in Poland